AMPL (P-2000) class of interceptor boats are series of ten watercraft built by M/s Anderson Marine Private Limited, Goa, India for the Indian Coast Guard.

Design
They are powered by two Deutz-MWM TBD 234 V12 diesel engines ( each) and one Deutz-MWM TBD 234 V8  diesel engine driving three Hamilton 402-series water-jet, . Initially 10 vessels were ordered in September 1990 with an option for 6 more, however the option was never invoked. They were built in cooperation with Sea King industries. Glass-reinforced plastic hulls were laid up by Anderson Marine, employing molds originally built by M/s Watercraft Marine, Shoreham, UK for the Royal Navy  (P-2000).
In order to meet the speed and performance requirements, vessels were configured in a triple-engine water jet arrangement and the machinery, superstructure and deck arrangement were redesigned by Amgram Ltd, Sussex, UK. The vessels were originally to have had a 20 mm Oerlikon AA forward but a remotely controlled 7.63 mm machine gun has been substituted.

Role
The vessels are intended for patrolling the coast, interdiction of smugglers and infiltrators, and search and rescue operations. The AMPL class interceptors have a complement of 1 officer and 11 sailors. The vessels have been based at various Indian coast guard station such as Mandapam, Mangalore, Visakhapatnam, Okha, Chennai, Kochi and Goa, and one boat was leased to Mauritius in 2001.

Ships of the class

See also
 
 Griffon/Grse class
 Mandovi Marine class
 Timblo class

References

External links
Design Service by M/s Amgram
C-139 Decommissioned by India
C-139 transferred to Mauritius
C-140 commissioned

Ships of the Indian Coast Guard
Fast attack craft of the Indian Coast Guard
Patrol boat classes
Auxiliary search and rescue ship classes